Kudret Kasar (1914 – April 2003) was a Turkish equestrian. He competed in two events at the 1948 Summer Olympics.

References

External links
 

1914 births
2003 deaths
Turkish male equestrians
Olympic equestrians of Turkey
Equestrians at the 1948 Summer Olympics
Sportspeople from İzmir
20th-century Turkish people